Delivery Hero is a German multinational online food-delivery service based in Berlin, Germany. The company operates in 50+ countries internationally in Europe, Asia, Latin America and the Middle East and partners with 500,000+ restaurants. Delivery Hero has increasingly branched out beyond food delivery, and is a leading player in the emerging category of quick commerce, which delivers small batch orders in under an hour.

In the third quarter of 2021, Delivery Hero processed 791 million orders - that equals a year-on-year growth of 52%.

While Delivery Hero is headquartered in Germany with offices worldwide, as a "gig economy company" (akin to Meituan, Uber or Airbnb) nearly all of the company's deliveries are carried out by workers using motorcycles, bicycles and cars, dispatched via the company's smartphone apps.

In general, and in contrast to recent legal precedents in Canada and Australia, Delivery Hero does not classify these couriers as employees. This policy has led to ongoing legal battles and labour disputes, and may be linked to the shutdowns of Delivery Hero's operations in several countries.

History
Delivery Hero Holding was founded in Berlin by Niklas Östberg, Kolja Hebenstreit, Markus Fuhrmann and Lukasz Gadowski in May 2011, with the goal of turning Delivery Hero into a global online food ordering platform. Under the leadership of Niklas Östberg and Fabian Siegel, Delivery Hero first expanded to Australia and the United Kingdom in 2011. In early 2012 the enterprise acquired Lieferheld in Germany and acquired a stake in Foodarena, Switzerland.

Delivery Hero then raised €25 million in new funding to finance acquisitions in four European countries: Sweden, Finland, Austria and Poland. In August 2012 Delivery Hero started expanding in both South Korea and China through YoGiYo and Aimifan and the Asian expansion continued in 2013 when Delivery Hero increased investment in TastyKhana following a successful cooperation period.

In 2012 and 2013, the harsh competition between the various delivery service online portals led the German press to dub the events as cyberwar between the big web-portals. There were reports of frequent Denial-of-service attack against each portal, accusations of data stealing as well as numerous lawsuits of the portals against each other. Delivery Hero was one of the more aggressive actors, and in 2012, the Delivery Hero office in Berlin was raided by police and the prosecution pressed charges against the Delivery Hero management. Delivery Hero was prosecuted for perpetrating DoS attacks against its competitors and stealing data from the other web services.

In 2014, Delivery Hero acquired a controlling stake in Latin American market leader PedidosYa and in August 2014 the group acquired German market leader and rival, pizza.de.

According to TNW Tech5 2014, Delivery Hero was one of Germany's top 3 fastest growing start ups at that time.

In April 2015, Delivery Hero acquired South Korean delivery service Baedaltong, one of the chief competitors of its own YoGiYo service. One month later Delivery Hero bought the Turkish competitor Yemeksepeti for 530 million Euro, which was the largest acquisition in this business sector to date. In October 2015 Delivery Hero also acquired Munich-based food delivery service Foodora from Rocket Internet.

Im May 2015, the company acquired e-food.gr, one of the largest food delivery players in Greece.

On 10 December 2016, Delivery Hero acquired Singapore-based Foodpanda, a company valued at an estimated $3 billion at that time.

In December 2016, the company announced the sale of its UK business Hungryhouse to Just Eat for at least £200m. However, the deal needed to be cleared by the Competition and Markets Authority of the UK before completion. On 12 October 2017, the CMA gave preliminary approval for Just Eat to acquire its smaller rival.

In 2016, the company was valued at 2 billion euros. Delivery Hero went public in a listing on the Frankfurt Stock Exchange on 30 June 2017. The market valued it at 4 billion euros (twice as much as its original value). The listing was the largest by a European technology business in almost two years. Delivery Hero raised almost €1bn from the offering.

In February 2018, Delivery Hero acquired deliveras.gr, a food delivery service in Greece.

In December 2018, Delivery Hero sold their German operations to Takeaway.com.

The German stock exchange Deutsche Börse announced on 19 August 2020 that Delivery Hero will replace Wirecard in Germany's leading index DAX.

In August 2020 Delivery Hero acquired Instashop for 360 million dollars, the largest price ever commanded by a Greek startup. The deal has also resulted in a big win for founders and investors, Jabbar Group and Venture Friends the two Venture Capital firms who invested early on in Instashop.

In December 2020, Delivery Hero announced  that it would take control of South Korea's biggest food delivery app, Woowa Brothers Corp., at a $4 billion valuation. As part of the transaction, Delivery Hero and the management of Woowa have entered into a strategic partnership regarding the operations of Delivery Hero and Woowa in the Asia Pacific region, and will be able to mutually leverage market insights, technology, and operational best practices.

In May 2021, Delivery Hero restarted its  German operations following the entry of competitors Uber Eats and Wolt. However, it once again exited the German market in December, citing high costs.

Investment
In November 2011, Delivery Hero received its first investment funding. In this financing round Team Europe, Holtzbrinck Ventures, Tengelmann Ventures, Kite Ventures and ru-Net together invested €4 million. The second funding round took place in April 2012. This time the existing investors raised their investments by €25 million to support the international growth of the enterprise. In August 2012 Delivery Hero received an additional €40 million funded primarily by Kite Ventures and Kreos Capital. A Series D financing round saw Delivery Hero receive $30 million from Phenomen Ventures in the latest Series D financing round.

In January 2014 Delivery Hero announced a Series E financing of $88 million led by Insight Venture Partners. A further $85m followed in April 2014 and was used to strengthen Delivery Hero's presence in core markets.

In September 2014 a further $350m of investment was secured from existing partners and Swedish fund Vostok Nafta. This was the largest investment in a European start up since 2009. In December 2014 the company raised another €287 Million from Rocket Internet. The total investment size by Rocket Internet was €496 Million in primary and secondary for a 30% stake in Delivery Hero. Three months later Rocket Internet increased its stake in Delivery Hero to 39%. In February 2018, Rocket Internet reduced its stake in Delivery Hero. As per the latest happening, the shareholding of Rocket Internet in Delivery Hero has reduced from 24.3% to 21.2%.

In January 2017, CEO Niklas Östberg announced that he wanted his company to be ready for an IPO in the second quarter of that year. Delivery Hero would focus on the integration of the recently acquired competitor Foodpanda. According to manager magazin, he was aiming at a valuation of about 3.5 billion Euros.

In May 2017 Naspers, a global internet and entertainment group and one of the world's largest technology investors, invested EUR 387 million in Delivery Hero. After increasing its stake in September 2017, Naspers today holds a stake of app. 26% in Delivery Hero, and so became the largest shareholder of the company.

In December 2017, Delivery Hero led the Series B funding round of Rappi, the largest on-demand delivery company in Latam, operating in 5 countries with over 30,000 couriers. Delivery Hero invested $105M and now holds a stake of 20%, becoming the largest shareholder of the company and bringing Niklas Oestberg to its board of directors. Despite this investment, Rappi will continue to operate as an independent company for the time being. Furthermore, the company owns 83.4% of Spanish startup Glovo, acquiring an additional 39.4% stake in December 2021 after its initial 44%.

In March 2021, the Dutch investment giant Prosus increased its stake in Delivery Hero by 8.2% to 24.99%, through its Dutch subsidiary MIH Food Holdings, making it effectively the largest shareholder in Delivery Hero. Prosus is the international internet assets division of Naspers. In the same month, Delivery Hero finalized the $4 billion acquisition of Woowa Brothers, which operates Baedal Minjok, South Korea's largest food delivery company.

Acquisitions
Delivery Hero has made a variety of mergers and acquisitions, including: 
 2011: Hungryhouse (UK)
 2012: Lieferheld (Germany), OnlinePizza (Sweden), PizzaPortal (Poland), Pizza-Online (Finland)
 2014: PedidosYa (Uruguay and Argentina), Clickdelivery (Latin America), Damejidlo (Czech Republic), Pizza.de (Germany), Baedaltong (Korea)
 2015: Talabat (MENA), Yemeksepeti (Turkey), e-food (Greece), foodora
 2016: Foodpanda (Asia)
 2017: Otlob (Egypt), Carriage (MENA), Appetito24 (Latin America), Foodfly (South Korea)
 2018: Hipmenu (Europe), Netcomidas (Bolivia) 
 2019: Foody (Cyprus), Zomato food delivery business (MENA), DeliveryRD (Dominican Republic)
 2020: InstaShop (Europe, the Middle East, and Africa)
 2021: Woowa Brothers (South Korea), Hugo (El Salvador), Glovo (Spain), chefmade (Denmark), Hungry (Denmark)

Financial figures

Classification of couriers as independent contractors 
In contrast to Delivery Hero's 2018 annual report, which includes "riders" as employees, Delivery Hero's national subsidiaries (Foodora, Foodpanda, etc.) usually classify their workers as independent contractors and not employees. This classification frees Delivery Hero from responsibilities towards its workers, including the right to workers' compensation, sick leave, overtime, unemployment benefits, hazard pay, and protections against wrongful termination of employment or firing.

Pro-employee rulings 
Couriers working for Delivery Hero's brands have mounted campaigns to assert their rights, including several successful legal battles. In Australia and Canada, these campaigns led to DH subsidiary Foodora's shutdown in the countries.

In each case, Foodora maintained that the shutdowns were carried out in response to market forces. However, Delivery Hero's 2018 Annual Report shows that the company does indeed assess country-by-country the costs and risks of government policies including social security, stating:

"Country specific and economic requirements, including employment legislation and social security, increase the complexity of the rider management as part of the own delivery services. The constant analysis of regulatory developments is needed to find the best approach in advancing the logistics business. Non-compliance with regulatory requirements may lead to higher rider costs and possible non-compliance fines. This also includes the risk of unavailability of rider personnel restraining the further expansion of the logistic services. This risk is considered as medium."

Australia 
In 2018 Foodora Australia abruptly shut down operations while facing several lawsuits: including one from the country's Fair Work Ombudsman which accused the company of sham contracting, and several court cases relating to unpaid benefits and wrongful dismissal.

The Transport Workers Union subsequently accused Foodora of shutting down to “avoid responsibility for paying its riders millions of dollars in backpay as a result of wage theft.”

Canada 
In 2019, Foodora couriers Montreal and Toronto began organizing. Subsequently, with the support of the Canadian Union of Postal Workers, Foodsters United, a group of couriers in Ontario, organized a vote on whether or not to unionize with the CUPW. Foodora Canada then challenged the vote prior to the announcement of results, on the basis that Foodora couriers were independent contractors and therefore did not have the right to unionize.

The Ontario Labour Relations Board then ruled that Foodora was misclassifying couriers as independent contractors, and, in a decision which was widely considered a win for couriers, ordered Foodora to consider its couriers "dependent contractors", a new category which affords workers some of the rights of employees. The decision only applied to couriers in Ontario, but was considered to be precedent setting.

In April 2020, two months after Ontario Labour Relations Board decision, Foodora Canada announced that it was shutting down, citing oversaturation of the Canadian market.

Greece 
In 2021, e-food.gr couriers in Greece were given an ultimatum to switch their working relationship from employees to independent contractors / freelancers. If not, they would not have their employment contracts renewed. This led to social media backlash over workers' rights. The company was forced to recall their decision due to public outcry, and offered contract renewals to its employees if they wish. Following further public scrutiny and strikes organized by its delivery workers, the company eventually promised to upgrade all delivery employees' employment contracts to indefinite duration contracts, signifying a victory for the delivery workers.

Monopolistic behaviour 
Talabat and Carriage, both of which owned by Delivery Hero, were sued by the Kuwait Competition Protection Authority (CPA) in 2019 after they refused to pay fines totalling more than 5 million KWD (~$16.5 million) due to their monopolistic acts in their contracts with restaurants.

References

Further reading

External links
 

Online food ordering
Online retailers of Germany
Food and drink companies based in Berlin
German companies established in 2011
Retail companies established in 2011
Transport companies established in 2011
Internet properties established in 2011
2017 initial public offerings
Companies listed on the Frankfurt Stock Exchange
Companies in the MDAX